The ancient position of Lord-Lieutenant of Rutland was abolished on 31 March 1974.

Between 1 April 1974 and its reestablishment on 8 April 1997 Rutland came under the Lord Lieutenant of Leicestershire. Since 1690, all lord-lieutenants have also been Custos Rotulorum of Rutland.

Lord-lieutenants of Rutland until 1974

Henry Manners, 2nd Earl of Rutland 1559–1563
Henry Hastings, 3rd Earl of Huntingdon ? – 14 December 1595
George Hastings, 4th Earl of Huntingdon 2 October 1596 – 30 December 1604
vacant
John Harington, 1st Baron Harington of Exton 16 May 1607 – 23 August 1613
John Harington, 2nd Baron Harington of Exton 8 October 1613 – 27 February 1614
Henry Hastings, 5th Earl of Huntingdon 1614–1642 jointly with
Ferdinando Hastings, 6th Earl of Huntingdon 27 December 1638 – 1642
David Cecil, 3rd Earl of Exeter 5 March 1642 - 1643
Interregnum
Baptist Noel, 3rd Viscount Campden 9 August 1660 – 29 October 1682
Edward Noel, 1st Earl of Gainsborough 17 November 1682 – 23 January 1688 jointly with
Wriothesley Noel, Viscount Campden 24 March 1685 – 23 January 1688
Henry Mordaunt, 2nd Earl of Peterborough 23 January 1688 – 28 August 1690
Bennet Sherard, 2nd Baron Sherard 28 August 1690 – 15 January 1700
Bennet Sherard, 3rd Baron Sherard 11 March 1700 – 14 November 1712
John Cecil, 6th Earl of Exeter 14 November 1712 – 12 September 1715
Bennet Sherard, 1st Earl of Harborough 12 September 1715 – 16 October 1732
Philip Sherard, 2nd Earl of Harborough 17 July 1733 – 20 July 1750
Brownlow Cecil, 9th Earl of Exeter 6 June 1751 – 12 April 1779
George Finch, 9th Earl of Winchilsea 12 April 1779 – 2 August 1826
Brownlow Cecil, 2nd Marquess of Exeter 7 October 1826 – 16 January 1867
Charles Noel, 2nd Earl of Gainsborough 22 February 1867 – 13 August 1881
William Tollemache, 9th Earl of Dysart 3 November 1881 – 29 March 1906
John Brocklehurst, 1st Baron Ranksborough 29 March 1906 – 28 February 1921
Gilbert Heathcote-Drummond-Willoughby, 2nd Earl of Ancaster 6 January 1921 – 29 September 1951
William Melville Codrington 5 February 1951 – 29 April 1963
Thomas Charles Stanley Haywood 12 August 1963 – 31 March 1974 (subsequently Lord Lieutenant of Leicestershire)

Lord-lieutenants of Rutland since 1997
Sir Thomas Lawrie (Jock) Kennedy 1 April 1997 – 14 July 2003
 Sir Lawrence Howard 14 July 2003 – 29 March 2018
 Dr Sarah Furness  3 April 2018 – present

References
 

Rutland
 
Rutland-related lists